The Illyriciani or Illyrian emperors were a group of Roman emperors during the Crisis of the Third Century who hailed from the region of Praetorian prefecture of Illyricum (in the Balkan peninsula), of native Thraco-Roman or Illyro-Roman stock, and raised chiefly from the ranks of the Roman army (whence they are ranked among the so-called "barracks emperors"). In the 2nd and 3rd centuries, the Illyricum and the other Danubian provinces (Dacia, Raetia, Pannonia, Moesia) held the largest concentration of Roman forces (12 legions, up to a third of the total army), and were a major recruiting ground. The advance of these low-born provincials was facilitated by a major shift in imperial policy from the time of Gallienus (253–268) on, when higher military appointments ceased to be exclusively filled by senators. Instead, professional soldiers of humble origin who had risen through the ranks to the post of primus pilus (which also entailed admission to the equestrian order) were placed as heads of the legions and filled the army's command structure. 

Since Decius hailed from the senatorial background, the historical period of the Illyrian emperors proper begins with Claudius Gothicus in 268 and continues in 284 with the rise of Diocletian and the institution of the Tetrarchy. This period was very important in the history of the Empire, since it represents the recovery from the Crisis of the Third Century, a long period of usurpations and military difficulties. All of the Illyrian emperors were trained and able soldiers, and they recovered most of the provinces and positions lost by their predecessors, including Gaul and the eastern provinces. Men of Illyrian or Thraco-Dacian origin however continued to be prominent in the Empire throughout the 4th century and beyond. 

The later Valentinic-Theodosian dynasties (364–457 AD) also hailed from the Pannonia region.

List
The following emperors are counted as Illyriciani:

 Decius, ruled AD 249–251
 Herennius Etruscus, ruled AD 251
 Hostilianus, ruled AD 251
 Claudius II "Gothicus", ruled AD 268–270 
 Quintillus, ruled AD 270
 Aurelian, ruled AD 270–275
 Probus, ruled AD 276–282
 Diocletian, ruled AD 284–305
 Maximianus "Herculius", ruled AD 286–305 
 Constantius Chlorus, ruled AD 305-306 
 Galerius, ruled AD 305-311 
 Severus II, ruled AD 306–307
 Constantine I, ruled AD 306–337
 Licinius, ruled AD 308-324 
 Constantius II, ruled AD 337-361
 Jovian, ruled AD 363–364
 Valentinianus I, ruled AD 364–375
 Valens, ruled AD 364–378
 Gratian, ruled AD 375–383
 Valentinianus II, ruled AD 375–392
 Constantius III, ruled AD 421 
 Valentinian III, ruled AD 425-455
 Marcian, ruled AD 450–457 
 Anastasius I, ruled AD 491–518
 Justin I, ruled AD 518–527 
 Justinian I, ruled AD 527-565
 Justin II, ruled AD 565–578

See also List of Roman Emperors for more details.
High grade cavalry was also called Equites Illyriciani

See also
Thraco-Roman
Illyro-Roman

References

Sources

 

 
Illyricum (Roman province)
Roman emperors
Illyrian people